Joel Brouwer (born 1968) is an American poet, professor and critic. His most recent poetry collection is Off Message released in 2016

He is also the author of Exactly What Happened, which received the Larry Levis Prize from Virginia Commonwealth University, and Centuries, a National Book Critics Circle "Notable Book."

In addition to writing poetry, Brouwer also writes essays, and regularly reviews books for The New York Times Book Review, Boston Review, Harvard Review, The Progressive, and other venues. His essays have been published in literary journals including AGNI, Boston Review, Parnassus: Poetry in Review, and his poems in AGNI, The Cortland Review, Crab Orchard Review, Crazyhorse, Georgia Review, Gettysburg Review, Iowa Review, The Journal, Massachusetts Review, Paris Review, Pleiades, Ploughshares, Poetry, The Prose Poem, and Tin House.

Brouwer was born in Grand Rapids, Michigan, in 1968, and is a graduate of Sarah Lawrence College and Syracuse University, and is a professor of English at the University of Alabama, and lives in Tuscaloosa, Alabama.

Awards
 Wisconsin Institute for Creative Writing Fellowship
 1999 National Endowment for the Arts Fellowship
 2001 Whiting Award
 2010 Guggenheim Fellowship

Published works
 Off Message (New York: Four Way Books, 2016)
 And So (New York: Four Way Books, 2009)
 Centuries (New York: Four Way Books, 2003)
 Exactly What Happened (West Lafayette, Indiana: Purdue University Press, 1999)

Chapbooks

 Flag Factory (New York: Artichoke Yink Press, 2008)
 Snow (New York: Salamandra Editions, 2008)
 Lt. Shrapnel (New York: Artichoke Yink Press, 2002)
 Think of It This Way (Tuscaloosa, Alabama: Fameorshame Press, 2000)
 This Just In (Los Angeles: Beyond Baroque Books, 1998)

References

External links
Profile at The Whiting Foundation
 The Poetry Foundation > Joel Brouwer
 AUDIO: The Cortland Review > Issue 18, November 2001 > Aesthetics by Joel Brouwer
 Four Way Books > Author Page > Joel Brouwer
 POEMS: http://www.thebluemoon.com/poetry/jbrouwer.shtml The Blue Moon Review > Two Poems by Joel Brouwer
 REVIEW BY BROUWER: The Washington Post > Arts & Living > Books > WHITE HEAT: The Friendship of Emily Dickinson and Thomas Wentworth Higginson By Brenda Wineapple > Reviewed by Joel Brouwer > August 3, 2008
 REVIEW OF BROUWER: WebdelSol > from Double Room Issue #3, Fall/Winter 2003 > Review by Robert Strong of Centuries by Joel Brouwer

1968 births
Living people
Writers from Grand Rapids, Michigan
American male poets
Poets from Michigan
Poets from Alabama
Syracuse University alumni
Sarah Lawrence College alumni
University of Alabama faculty
National Endowment for the Arts Fellows
21st-century American poets
21st-century American male writers